Peter Fyhr is a Swedish former professional footballer who played as a striker.

Career
Fyhr played in his native Sweden for teams including Gefle IF and IFK Norrköping. Fyhr also spent the 1996-97 season with Scottish team St Johnstone, making four appearances in the Scottish Football League for them that season.

In June 1999, readers of magazine FourFourTwo voted Fyhr as St Johnstone's worst ever player.

References

1970s births
Living people
Swedish footballers
St Johnstone F.C. players
Scottish Football League players
Swedish expatriate footballers
Expatriate footballers in Scotland
Gefle IF players
IFK Norrköping players
Year of birth missing (living people)
Place of birth missing (living people)
Association football forwards